Football at the 1912 Summer Olympics was the association football tournament that featured eleven teams, all from Europe. Four teams were drawn into eight groups of two where they each played once in a single-elimination format: the rest of the teams directly passed to the quarter finals. Belgium withdrew shortly before the draw, while   France withdrew after the draw.

Great Britain won the competition. Denmark won silver and the Netherlands won bronze.

First round

Finland vs Italy 

Notes

Austria vs Germany

Sweden vs Netherlands

Norway vs France

Second round

Finland vs Russia

Great Britain vs Hungary

Denmark vs Norway

Netherlands vs Austria

Semi finals

Great Britain vs Finland

Denmark vs Netherlands

Bronze medal game

Netherlands vs Finland

Final

Great Britain vs Denmark

References 

Football at the 1912 Summer Olympics